The , often called the  is an expressway in Japan that connects Onomichi, Hiroshima and Imabari, Ehime, going through nine of the Geiyo Islands, including Ōshima, Ōmishima, and Innoshima. The road and multiple bridges crossing across the Seto Inland Sea is one of the three main transportation links of the Honshū–Shikoku Bridge Project, constructed between the islands of Honshu and Shikoku.

The expressway contains fifty-five bridges, including the Kurushima Kaikyō Bridge, the world's longest series of suspension bridges, and the Tatara Bridge, the world's fourth longest cable-stayed bridge. The route is famed for its scenic views and can be crossed by bicycles, mopeds and pedestrians as well as cars.

Cycle tourism
The road and bridge route was designed with an integrated cycle lane linking Onomichi in Hiroshima Prefecture with Imabari in Ehime Prefecture.

As accessing the Shin-Onomichi bridge involves a steep climb, cyclists are encouraged to use a short ferry between Onomichi and Mukaishima, but all other bridges on the route feature a designated cycle path. Bicycle rental and drop off locations are available along the route.

The route is a toll road, but tolls were waived for cyclists until March 31, 2022, in an effort to promote tourism.

Gallery

See also
 Expressways of Japan
 Honshū-Shikoku Bridge Project

References

External links

Nishiseto Expressway at the Honshu-Shikoku Bridge Authority
Shimanami Kaido Cycle Route Information in English

Expressways in Japan

Cycleways in Japan

Roads in Ehime Prefecture
Roads in Hiroshima Prefecture